Elections were held in the Australian state of Queensland on 5 February 1908 to elect the 72 members of the state's Legislative Assembly.

The election, held less than 9 months after the previous election, was made necessary by a series of events which had seen former Premier William Kidston, who commanded a majority on the floor of the Assembly, resign following an attempt to convince the Governor of Queensland to appoint sympathetic members to the Queensland Legislative Council, which had blocked key legislative measures. Following Kidston's resignation, Opposition leader Robert Philp was sent for and formed a ministry, but the ministry almost immediately lost a vote of no confidence in the Assembly, and as such, a new election had to be called.

Key dates

Results
The Kidstonites contested only 32 of the 72 seats, compared to 55 at the previous election.

|}

 205,892 electors were enrolled to vote at the election, but 12 seats (16.7% of the total) representing 30,069 voters were uncontested—six Labor seats, five Conservatives and one Kidston.
 In 11 electorates, voters had two votes each, so the total number of votes exceeds the total number of voters.

See also
 Members of the Queensland Legislative Assembly, 1907–1908
 Members of the Queensland Legislative Assembly, 1908–1909
 Second Philp Ministry
 Second Kidston Ministry

References

External links

Elections in Queensland
1908 elections in Australia
1900s in Queensland
February 1908 events